Sony has released a number of previously released PlayStation video games, remastered in high-definition (HD) for their newer consoles, a form of porting. A number of related programs exist, the most prominent two being "Classics HD" (also known as "HD Collection") and "PSP Remasters". The former consists of multiple PlayStation 2 games compiled on one Blu-ray Disc. The latter are individual PlayStation Portable games republished on Blu-ray. These games are not direct ports, but remastered versions in high-definition, to take advantage of the newer consoles' capabilities. The remastering of the games include updated graphics, new textures, and Trophy support, and some of the remastered games released on PlayStation 3 have included 3D and PlayStation Move support. Some HD remasters have also been released individually or in bundles as downloads on the PlayStation Store; others are released exclusively as downloads.

This remastering began in 2009 with the release of God of War Collection; it originally started as only PlayStation 2 (PS2) games being remastered for PlayStation 3 (PS3). PlayStation Portable (PSP) games began being remastered for the latter in 2011; Monster Hunter Portable 3rd HD ver. was the first of these. After the release of the PlayStation Vita in 2012, several of the remastered PS2 and PSP games began being released for this platform. Some original PlayStation (PS1) games also began being remastered. With the launch of the PlayStation 4 (PS4) in 2013, Vita and PS3 games, in addition to the older platforms' games, began being remastered for it. Developers have also remastered games that were not originally released on a PlayStation console and remastered them for PlayStation platforms, in addition to releasing them for other non-PlayStation platforms. This remastering extended to the PlayStation 5 (PS5) with its release in November 2020 with some of its launch titles being remastered PS4 games.

Classics HD is the official name given for these compilations in Europe; no equivalent of such name exists in North America or Japan. However, these games include the subtitle "Remastered in High Definition" or "HD Collection" on the North American cover. PSP Remasters is the official name given by Sony for collections featuring remasters of PSP games. The PSP Remasters line includes the same features as the Classics HD line, as well as cross-platform play and shareable saves between the two versions, however, PSP Remasters do not include Trophy support. Remastered games released on the PlayStation 4 have sometimes had the subtitle "HD Remaster", "Remastered", or "Definitive Edition". PlayStation 4 remasters have all the same features as remastered collections on PS3, but do not feature 3D or PlayStation Move support, though later releases could potentially support Move; 3D, however, is not a feature of the PlayStation 4 like it was on PlayStation 3.

Overview
The first remastered collection to be released was God of War Collection, which consisted of God of War and God of War II. This collection was released before the official line of Classics HD games. God of War Collection was brought about from feedback in anticipation for God of War III and what type of content fans would like to see in a special edition of that game. From this feedback, Sony released the collection separate from God of War III as a way to introduce new players to the franchise. The success of God of War Collection prompted Sony to make a new line of games that would be bannered Classics HD in PAL regions (North American copies simply have the subtitle "Remastered in High Definition" or "HD Collection"). One of the reasons why this brand was created is that PlayStation 2 discs are not compatible with PlayStation 3 consoles released after August 2007 (only the original 20 GB and 60 GB models, and the first iteration of the 80 GB model are compatible).

The second series of games ported to the PlayStation 3 and first to use the Classics HD banner was The Sly Collection, released in November 2010. The Prince of Persia series was the first non-Sony published games remastered, published by Ubisoft. On November 2, 2010, God of War Collection became the first remastered collection to be released as a digital download on the PlayStation Store, and simultaneously the first time PlayStation 2-original games were released on the PlayStation Store. The Tomb Raider Trilogy was announced on December 19, 2010 and included all three second era games of the series: HD remasters of Tomb Raider: Legend and Tomb Raider: Anniversary for the first time on the PlayStation 3, plus Tomb Raider: Underworld.

At E3 2011 during Sony's press conference, the "PSP Remasters" line was announced. Monster Hunter Portable 3rd HD ver. was the first of this line to be announced. Sony Computer Entertainment Japan announced that the PSP Remasters line would not include Trophy support; God of War: Origins Collection, despite both games within it being remasters of PSP games, is not part of this line thus has Trophy support.

During an interview with Game Informer, Kingdom Hearts creator Tetsuya Nomura expressed interest in "HD versions" and was "researching them" for his Kingdom Hearts series. He said, "I would like to do something about the series being spread over so many different consoles, too. I am thinking a lot about the future." In September 2012, Square Enix announced Kingdom Hearts HD 1.5 Remix, a compilation for the PlayStation 3 including both Kingdom Hearts Final Mix and Re:Chain of Memories in HD with Trophy support. Additionally, the collection included HD cinematic scenes from Kingdom Hearts 358/2 Days, and released internationally in 2013. The following year, Kingdom Hearts HD 2.5 Remix released on PS3, containing Kingdom Hearts II Final Mix, Birth by Sleep Final Mix, and HD remastered cinematic scenes from Re:coded. The inclusion of Birth by Sleep Final Mix marked the first time that the final mix version was released outside Japan.

With the launch of the PlayStation 4, some developers have decided to take advantage of the more powerful hardware and remaster their previously released PlayStation 3 titles on the newer platform. Some of these previous titles also appeared on the Xbox 360 and some have been remastered for release on Xbox One and Microsoft Windows as well. These remastered versions sometimes include the subtitle "Definitive Edition". Developers have since stopped remastering games for older platforms and are only remastering games for the newer platforms.

An updated version of Injustice: Gods Among Us, titled Injustice: Gods Among Us Ultimate Edition and including all DLC of the original, was released in November 2013 for PlayStation 3, PlayStation 4, Xbox 360, Microsoft Windows, and PlayStation Vita. The PS4 version, which was a launch title, and the Windows version is remastered. In January 2014, Square Enix released an updated version of 2013's Tomb Raider as Tomb Raider: Definitive Edition for PlayStation 4 and Xbox One. In July 2014, Sony released The Last of Us Remastered for PlayStation 4. It is a remastered port of the PS3 title The Last of Us for the newer platform in terms of quality. In March 2015, Sony announced that PS3 title God of War III would be remastered and released as God of War III Remastered for the PlayStation 4 in July 2015, in celebration of the franchise's tenth anniversary. The remastered version features full 1080p support at 60 frames per second and a photo mode, allowing players to edit their photos and share them with their friends.

In anticipation for the PlayStation 4 exclusive Uncharted 4: A Thief's End, Sony released Uncharted: The Nathan Drake Collection for the PS4 in October 2015, featuring remastered versions of the PS3 titles, Uncharted: Drake's Fortune, Uncharted 2: Among Thieves, and Uncharted 3: Drake's Deception. The collection is single-player only (the PS3 versions of Uncharted 2 and Uncharted 3 had online multiplayer), and included a voucher for the Uncharted 4 multiplayer beta. To finish out the remastering of the Kingdom Hearts games, Kingdom Hearts HD 2.8 Final Chapter Prologue released in January 2017 and consisted of Kingdom Hearts 3D: Dream Drop Distance, Kingdom Hearts 0.2: Birth by Sleep – A Fragmentary Passage, and HD cinematics from Kingdom Hearts χ Back Cover. Unlike the previous two collections, which were exclusive to PlayStation 3, this collection released exclusively on PlayStation 4. Additionally, Kingdom Hearts HD 1.5 + 2.5 Remix, featuring both of the PS3 collections, released on PS4 in March 2017. Square Enix later bundled Kingdom Hearts HD 2.8 Final Chapter Prologue with the Kingdom Hearts HD 1.5 + 2.5 Remix collections as part of a new compilation, Kingdom Hearts: The Story So Far, released in North America on October 30, 2018, for the PlayStation 4. The Xbox One and Xbox Game Pass versions released on February 18, 2020.

Constructor HD was the first game that was released on the original PlayStation to be remastered when it released in January 2017. At E3 2016, it was announced that the original Crash Bandicoot trilogy, Crash Bandicoot, Crash Bandicoot 2: Cortex Strikes Back, and Crash Bandicoot: Warped, would be remastered for PlayStation 4. The name was revealed as the Crash Bandicoot N. Sane Trilogy at the PlayStation Experience event on December 3, 2016, which also revealed that it would release in 2017. Developer Vicarious Visions coined the term "remaster plus" in describing whether or not the N. Sane Trilogy was a remaster or a remake. They said that they did not consider it a remake, because they did not "fully remake [the games]". They said that they used Naughty Dog's original level geometry to rebuild the Crash gameplay from scratch. As the levels were coming together, they also added their own art, animation, and audio.

The cycle of remastering older games for newer platforms continued with the launch of the PlayStation 5 in November 2020, as some of its launch titles were remastered versions of previous generations' games. This is also true of the Xbox Series X/S, which released two days before the PS5.

Additional content
Along with Trophies, 3D support, and HD upgrades, the various compilations also boast various other extras to accompany them. God of War Collection, for example, contains bonus materials for God of War II that were originally released as a DVD in the God of War II two-disc set on PS2; early copies also included the God of War III demo. God of War: Origins Collection included the documentary, God of War - Game Directors Live, the Kratos Legionnaire bonus skin, and the Forest of the Forgotten combat arena, which were all originally released as a download via the Ghost of Sparta pre-order package. In Japan, the PS3 version of Metal Gear Solid: Peace Walker: HD Edition is standalone and includes a code to download the PSP version while Metal Gear Solid 2 and Metal Gear Solid 3 are packaged separately in Metal Gear Solid HD and come instead with a download code for the original Metal Gear Solid. In North America and Europe, the three HD games are packaged together in Metal Gear Solid HD Collection with no downloadable games. Tekken Hybrid not only includes an HD upgrade of Tekken Tag Tournament and a prologue based on Tekken Tag Tournament 2, but also comes with the 3D CGI film Tekken: Blood Vengeance. Though the actual games are not included, Kingdom Hearts HD 1.5 Remix includes the cut scenes from Kingdom Hearts 358/2 Days, remastered in high definition, and cut scenes from Kingdom Hearts Re:Coded are included in the Kingdom Hearts HD 2.5 Remix, also remastered in high definition.

To help showcase the addition of the PlayStation Move, The Sly Collection includes various additional minigames as well. The Ico & Shadow of the Colossus Collection features bonus content, including two XMB Dynamic Themes and exclusive video content for Ico, Shadow of the Colossus, and The Last Guardian; a demo for the latter was considered for inclusion, but was not. The collection also features the original PlayStation 2 cover arts for both games on the inner side of the case. The Silent Hill Collection includes both original and new recorded dialog for Silent Hill 2.

A notable feature with the PSP Remasters is that players can import saved games between the PSP version and the PS3 version and vice versa.

Games
This following three lists contains games that have been remastered and released on the PlayStation 3, PlayStation Vita, and PlayStation 4 consoles. Some games are part of the original Classics HD and PSP Remasters line, which were PlayStation 2 and PlayStation Portable games, remastered and released exclusively on the PlayStation 3, followed by PlayStation Vita and PlayStation 4. Developers have extended the remastering of games to titles that were not PlayStation originals, and remastered releases have been released on platforms other than PlayStation. Originally, multiple games were remastered into collections, such as God of War Collection, featuring remastered versions of God of War and God of War II. Developers have since also remastered and released games individually, such as Killzone HD, which is a remastered version of Killzone.

PlayStation 3

Released exclusively as download.
Released as a download and as part of the Killzone Trilogy.

PlayStation Vita

Released exclusively as download.
Released at same time as PS3 remaster version.
Remaster originally released on PS3 before Vita.

PlayStation 4

Released exclusively as download.
Released at same time as PS3 and/or Vita remastered version.
Remaster originally released on PS3 and/or Vita before PS4.
The Ultimate Edition was released on other platforms, but the PS4 and PC versions are remastered.
New game that takes place after the original Birth by Sleep.
Beyond: Two Souls remastered was released as a standalone before the collection on November 24, 2015. Heavy Rain remastered was released as a standalone on March 1, 2016 (North America) and March 4, 2016 (Europe).

PlayStation 5 

Released exclusively as download.

PlayStation Collections
PlayStation Collections are bundles of games for the PlayStation 3. They contain both remastered games and games that have already been released for the PS3, in addition to bonus content. The first collections announced in this line were the God of War Saga and the Infamous Collection, which were released on August 28, 2012 along with the Ratchet & Clank Collection, which was rebranded for this new line.

Redeemable voucher download.

 Only Chains of Olympus and Ghost of Sparta

 Only Infamous: Festival of Blood

 Only Killzone 3

 Only Resistance 3

See also
New Play Control!
List of PS one Classics (Japan)
List of PS one Classics (North America)
List of PS one Classics (PAL region)
List of PlayStation 2 Classics for PlayStation 3
Video game remake
List of video game remakes and remastered ports

References

 
Budget ranges